Iuliana Simon (born 22 February 1934) is a Romanian cross-country skier. She competed in the women's 10 kilometres and the women's 3 × 5 kilometre relay events at the 1956 Winter Olympics.

References

External links
 

1934 births
Living people
Romanian female cross-country skiers
Olympic cross-country skiers of Romania
Cross-country skiers at the 1956 Winter Olympics
People from Harghita County